Brauer College is a government secondary school, located in Warrnambool, Victoria, Australia.

Originally established as Warrnambool Technical School in 1911, the school was renamed Brauer College at the beginning of 1990 (after noted 20th-century Warrnambool doctor, Alfred Brauer), to reflect its change from a technical institution into a more mainstream college. Brauer has since developed into a large secondary school with an enrolment of approximately 850 students ranging from years 7 to 12.
The school is known for both outstanding curricular and extra curricular activities, including consistently high VCE results and outstanding levels of success in public speaking, performing arts and sporting areas.

Boyle has been principal of the College since 2012. The school council president is Darren Hancy.

Campuses 
Brauer's main campus is located on Carumut Road, towards the outskirts of Warrnambool's urban area.  The school features a state of the art performing arts centre and gymnasium, as well as extensive classroom and other facilities including a driver education track and supergrass tennis courts.  In 2007 the library and science wing were refurbished in addition to the construction of the Australian Technical College Warrnambool campus.  Directly north of the school, a multimillion-dollar sports facility known as Brauerander Park has been built. The park features an athletics track as well as planned facilities for field events, soccer & AFL football fields and a 3-hole golf course.  The track was completed in mid-May 2007 and was officially opened by the Victorian Governor, Professor David de Kretser in September 2007.

Dunkeld Annexe

The Dunkeld Annexe is a Brauer owned facility located in Dunkeld, in the southern Grampians, used for the purpose of school camps. Years 7 and 8 camping trips take place here where the accessibility to outdoor education is one of its many benefits.

Controversies

"Two brick rule" 
In 2007, the college received extended media attention regarding its unique "two brick rule". The rule, which stated that students of the opposite sex could not come within two brick lengths of each other,
was designed to eliminate greetings such as hugging, for fear that this might lead to sexual contact.

Misandry Incident 
The college received widespread media attention in March 2021 after it required male students as young as 11 to stand during a school assembly and 'apologise' for their gender to the female students. This caused a backlash from parents who  reported that their sons were confused as to why everybody would look at them as predators.

School principal, Jane Boyle, has resisted calls to resign but has issued an apology, admitting the assembly was " inappropriate ". She has not however, accepted responsibility for violating school policy .

Extra curricular 
Aside from the school's curricular achievements, Brauer is also well known within both the Warrnambool and wider community for its success in extra curricular activities.

Public speaking

Brauer has a very strong and long tradition in the art of public speaking and debating.  All students are taught the skills to participate in public speaking.  The school has long associations with the Warrnambool Eisteddfod, public speaking and debating competitions run by the Rostrum Club, the Lions Club, the Legacy Group, the Apex Club, the VCAA Plain English Speaking Competition and the mooting competition run by Bond University.  Brauer's success in these fields has been unmatched, with state and national finalists and champions in all aforementioned competitions.  At Eisteddfod level, in 2006 Brauer had over 150 students compete with a high rate of success.  In the debating section, Brauer won the overall aggregate for the 16th consecutive year, cementing the school's level of commitment and success.  Brauer also participates in the Ballarat region of the Debaters Association of Victoria (DAV), where up to 30 students travel each round to participate, several debaters have previously won Swannie Awards for best debater and progressed to the state final debating rounds.  Each year a team of senior public speaking students are chosen to take part in the Bond university mooting competition – an exclusive competition in which Brauer is the only Victorian government school to have won the national title and one of only two schools to have won the competition twice.

Music/performing arts

Brauer's music and performing arts program is, like public speaking, a large part of the school's cohort.  Annually, the Brauer musical comprises approximately 150 students as cast, band and backstage members.  In 2006 the production was "Copacabana", with "We Will Rock You" in 2007.  The musical has been an annual part of Brauer since 1984.
Additionally, the Brauer Amateur Dramatics Club (or BAD) produce a non-musical, dramatic performance.

Brauer also supports a number of bands, ensembles and musical solo performers with tuition enabling students to participate in the Warrnambool Eisteddfod and other prestigious music competitions. Around 300 students are involved with the music program.

Sport

Brauer is a major player in the sporting community. The college sports academy consists of 14 sports with students from years 7-12 participating. Academy teams compete against other schools and in larger competitions.
House sports are also a major part of the school's sporting program. There are four houses:
 Geefa (green)
 Vesta (red)
 Aurora (yellow)
 Orion (blue)
Members of each house participate annually for house championships in swimming, athletics, cross country and overall. In 2006, Geefa was house champion, with the 2007 championships still underway.

Industry Education Centre (formerly Australian Technical College Warrnambool) 
In 2006, Brauer in partnership with Baimbridge College Hamiltion won the tender for the Australian Technical College in Warrnambool. Commencing its programs at the beginning of 2007, the ATCW offers courses in commercial cookery, mechanics, engineering, metal fabrication and carpentry.

Following the federal election of Kevin Rudd and the ALP to power in 2007, the ATC project was discontinued.  As the ATC Warrnambool campus was one of the few finished colleges in the state, it remained operational in various states until in 2009 it became the Industry Education Centre, jointly operated by South West Institute of TAFE, Brauer College & other local school and employment agency bodies.

Alumni 
 Tom Ballard and Alex Dyson, radio presenters
 Ben Barber, actor
 Marc Leishman, golfer
 Jordan Lewis, AFL footballer
 Brent Moloney, AFL footballer
 Kathryn Ross, Australian rower
 Justin Street, musician

Other information 
 Past principals include Duncan Stalker OAM who was principal from 1978–2001 as well as being president of the Australian Schools Principals Association throughout the late nineties. Stalker is now head of the Brauerander Trust, responsible for the development and construction of Brauerander Park.
 The school's first principal was John King. One of Brauer's most prestigious awards, the John King Citizenship Award, is named in his honour and is awarded to only a handful of students each year who demonstrate exceptional citizenship, leadership and academic/sporting endeavours.
 Years 7, 8 and 9 camps take place at the school's Dunkeld camp, while at year 10 students have the option of going on a skiing trip to the Victorian Alps, and one of two major central Australia/east coast trips in year 11.
 The school's LOTE program is Japanese, with several trips to Miura (Warrnambool's sister city) and Fukuoka taking place each year.
 Additionally, the school also offers an annual trip to China, and a biannual trip to India where a boys' cricket team take on Daly College in an annual exchange program.
 Brauer is host to approximately 20 exchange students from Japan, China, South Korea, Germany, Switzerland, Sweden and Sudan.
 Students participate annually in the Australian Geography, English, Writing, Mathematics, Science and Information Technology competitions as well as other competitions such as Tournament of Minds.

References

External links 
 
 2017 Outstanding VCE results article appeared in the Warrnambool Standard 15 December 2017
 Sydney Morning Herald article, as appeared in the Age

Education in Warrnambool
Public high schools in Victoria (Australia)
Educational institutions established in 1911
1911 establishments in Australia